Lala is a village in the Narowal District of  Punjab province of Pakistan. It is located at 32°15'0N 74°48'0E with an altitude of 245 metres (807 feet). Neighbouring settlements include Seowal, Qila Sobha Singh and Depoke

References

Villages in Narowal District